This is a list of well-known artistic performers that have visited the international festival Moldejazz in Molde through the years.

Celebrety Moldejazz Artists 

Benny Bailey (1961/70),
Lucky Thompson (1962),
Dexter Gordon (1963/64/65/71/72),
Sonny Stitt (1963/81),
Niels-Henning Ørsted Pedersen (1964–68, 70–74, 81, 84–85, 88–90, 93, 2000/02),
Benny Golson (1964),
Jimmy Witherspoon (1964),
Tete Montoliu (1964),
George Russell (1965),
Kenny Drew (1965–68/75/86),
Wayne Shorter (1966, 2007, 2012),
Charles Lloyd (1966),
Don Byas (1966),
Jack DeJohnette (1966/77/81/86/97/2006),
J. J. Johnson (1966),
Keith Jarrett (1966, 1972, 1973, 1986),
Roland Kirk (1967),
Ben Webster (1967/69),
Freddie Hubbard (1967/84/92),
Phil Woods (1968/69/72/79/98),
Don Cherry (1968/79/82/84/87),
Joe Henderson (1968/84),
Clark Terry (1971/73/99),
Herbie Hancock (1971/88/97/98, 2002/10),
Weather Report/Joe Zawinul (1971/89/99),
Chick Corea (1972, 2000/07)
Ralph Towner (1973/75/77/78),
Eubie Blake (1973),
Gary Burton (1974, 2002/07/10),
Wallace Davenport (1975/77/78),
McCoy Tyner (1975/96/2006),
Max Roach (1977/83),
Carla Bley (1978/93/99),
Bill Evans trio incl. Marc Johnson & Joe LaBarbera (1980),
Lester Bowie (1982/89–92/95),
Art Blakey (1983/90),
Jaco Pastorius (1983),
Stéphane Grappelli (1984),
Miles Davis (1984/85),
John Scofield (1984–87, 89–90, 92/95/97/99, 2006, 2012), 
Modern Jazz Quartet (1985),
Oscar Peterson/The Manhattan Transfer (1987),
Ornette Coleman (1987, 2008),
Dizzy Gillespie (1989),
Terri Lyne Carrington (1990, 2011)
Al Jarreau (1996),
Marcus Miller (1996/97, 2013/19)
Milt Jackson (1998),
Dee Dee Bridgewater (1999, 2015)
Pat Metheny (2001/16/17),
Dianne Reeves (2003/11),
Branford Marsalis (2004, 2016),
Joshua Redman (2006/09/15/16/19),
Bobby McFerrin (2010),
Sonny Rollins (2010),
John McLaughlin (2011),
Joe Lovano (2012)
Ron Carter (2016)
David Sanborn (2018)

References

External links 

Molde
Lists of jazz musicians
Culture in Møre og Romsdal